Mindtrap is a puzzle video game for the ZX Spectrum released in 1989 by Mastertronic. Ports followed for the Commodore 64 and the Amstrad CPC. With 999,999 levels, the object is to rearrange grids of coloured dice so that they are all aligned, before running out of time or available moves.

Gameplay
Each screen (called a floor), has a set of dice of different colours (blue, red, magenta, green, cyan and white). The player shuffles the dice around the play area, using a frame surrounding 4 of the dice at a time. Dice within this frame can be rotated 90° around a central axis, with the ultimate aim of lining up the dice in the correct colour before the time and move limit expired.

Later levels introduce a third dimension of the dice scattered between 2 and 5 floors. Players then have to rearrange the dice both on the floor they are on and between the floors to finish the level. The number of moves and time allowed increase with the subsequent number of floors. Some areas of the floor are blocked off to the frame, so different routes are needed to move the dice.

The game creates a 32-digit alphanumeric password after successful completion of a level, which is tied to the player name, to allow later resumption.

External links

1989 video games
Amstrad CPC games
Commodore 64 games
Mastertronic games
Puzzle video games
Video games developed in Serbia
ZX Spectrum games
Single-player video games